HSwMS Garmer was a small river monitor built for the Swedish Royal Skerry Artillery in the mid-1860s. She was designed to operate on the Swedish canals and lakes as well as in the shallow waters of the coast. The ship's captain had to steer the ship as well as aim and fire her gun. Garmer was sold for scrap in 1893.

Design and description
In 1865 the Navy Minister, Baltzar von Platen, persuaded the Riksdag of the Estates to establish the Royal Skerry Artillery as part of the Swedish Army to defend the inner Swedish waters and protect the flanks of Swedish fortresses. This force was to be equipped with ten small monitors to operate in shallow waters that could navigate the Göta Canal system that linked Gothenburg on the west coast to Söderköping on the Baltic Sea.

HSwMS Garmer, named after the dog Garmr from Norse mythology, was the first of these monitors. She was designed by the inventor John Ericsson
and Lieutenant John Christian d'Ailly. Garmer was intended to support Karlsborg Fortress on Lake Vättern. A report to the Parliament of Sweden described her as lacking a keel, flat-bottomed amidships and had a sharp bow and stern. Her crew numbered 20 officers and men.

Garmer had a single  steam engine imported from New York that was powered by a single fire-tube boiler. She was armed with a single muzzle-loading  M/66 smoothbore gun mounted in a long, fixed, oval-shaped turret. In 1877 Garmer received a 10-barreled  M/75 machine gun designed by Helge Palmcrantz.

Garmers commander was rather overtasked as this excerpt explains: "The Commander is stationed inside a cupola and stands by the steering gear where he must control the vessel's movements at the same time as filling the touch hole and firing the gun. Sometimes there are difficulties with the engine. Since the gun is fixed, training is by the movement of the vessel."

Service
Garmer was launched in 1867 by Motala Verkstad at Norrköping and delivered the following year. When the Royal Skerry Artillery was dissolved in 1875 she was incorporated into the Swedish Navy. Garmer was sold for scrap in 1893.

Footnotes

References
 
 

 

1867 ships
Ships built in Norrköping
Monitors of the Swedish Navy